The House of Lecubarri was an ancient noble family, possibly a cadet branch of the House of Poitiers, through Bernard William I. The etymology of the name comes from the words lek(h)u (place) and barri (new), meaning "new place" in the Basque language of the north of Spain. The House has transmitted its status of nobility since time immemorial.

History
The origins of the family trace back to the 11th century (Late Middle Ages), when more than half of the Iberian Peninsula was under the rule of the Moors. The first appearance of the surname may be attributed to Bernard William I of Gascony, Duke of Vasconia, who was exiled and forced to renounce the throne of the duchy, hiding himself in Biscay, formerly the Kingdom of Navarre. It is claimed that the same Duke fathered a son who took the surname "Lecoubarry" due to his condition as a bastard son born out of wedlock. According to the French monk Adhemar de Chabannes, the duke kept romances with various women, facilitating his eventual abdication in favor of his brother, Sancho VI of Gascony, last duke under the House of Gascony.

The noble House remained present centuries later, in the court of the king Theobald I, son of Blanche of Navarre and nephew of Sancho VII, where it took part in his foreign issues and private security from 1234 to 1240 obtaining, the Lordship of Lecubarri, which comprised certain domains in Navarre.

See also
Duchy of Gascony

References

Lecubarri